The Eastern Pennsylvania Collegiate Basketball League (EPCBL), also known as the Eastern Pennsylvania Conference (EPC) and Eastern Pennsylvania Collegiate League,  was a collegiate basketball league that began in the 1931–32 season.

The original seven teams included:
Gettysburg
Franklin & Marshall
Albright
Ursinus
Muhlenberg
Lebanon Valley
Drexel

Member schools

Champions

*In March 1942, it was decided that no 1943 league champion would be recognized since all the teams would not be able to play each other.

References

 
1931 establishments in the United States
1943 disestablishments in the United States
Sports leagues established in 1931
Sports leagues disestablished in 1943]
Defunct NCAA Division I conferences
Sports in the Eastern United States
Basketball in Pennsylvania
College sports in Pennsylvania